Dendropsophus is a genus of frogs in the family Hylidae. They are distributed in Central and South America, from southern Mexico to northern Argentina and Uruguay. They are sometimes known under the common name Fitzinger neotropical treefrogs or yellow treefrogs

This genus was resurrected in 2005 following a major revision of the family Hylidae. The species believed to have 30 chromosomes, previously placed in the genus Hyla, were later moved to this genus.

Species 
The following species are recognised in the genus Dendropsophus:

References

External links 
  [web application]. 2008. Berkeley, California: Dendropsophus. AmphibiaWeb, available at http://amphibiaweb.org/. (Accessed: Apr 28, 2008).

 
Hylidae
Amphibians of Central America
Amphibians of South America
Amphibian genera
Taxa named by Leopold Fitzinger